

The Bernard 15 C1 or Bernard SIMB AB 15 was a 1920s French single-seat sesquiplane fighter aircraft designed and built by the Société Industrielle des Métaux et du Bois (SIMB). With the structural failure of the earlier Bernard 14 the Bernard 15 was an improved variant with a greater span upper wing. It was powered by a Hispano-Suiza 12Hb inline piston engine and had a fixed tailskid landing gear. The performance was not an improvement on the Bernard SIMB AB 14 and only the prototype was built.

Specifications

See also

Notes

Bibliography

External links

 Bernard 15 

1920s French fighter aircraft
015
Sesquiplanes
Single-engined tractor aircraft